A husband is a male in a marital relationship, who may also be referred to as a spouse. The rights and obligations of a husband regarding his spouse and others, and his status in the community and in law, vary between societies and cultures, and have varied over time.

In monogamous cultures, there are only two parties to a marriage, which is enforced by laws against bigamy and polygamy. Traditionally, the husband was regarded as the head of the household and was expected to be the sole provider or breadwinner, a role that continues in some cultures (sometimes described as paternalistic). Today, a husband is not necessarily considered the breadwinner of the family, especially if his spouse has a more financially rewarding occupation or career. In such cases, it is not uncommon for a husband to be considered a stay-at-home father if the married couple have children.

The term continues to be applied to such a man who has separated from his spouse and ceases to be applied to him only when his marriage has come to an end following a legally recognized divorce or the death of his spouse. On the death of his spouse, a husband is referred to as a widower; after a divorce, a man may be referred to as the "ex-husband" of his former spouse.

Origin and etymology

See also torp.

Related terms
At the conclusion of a valid wedding, the marrying parties acquire the status of married persons and, while the marriage persists, a man is called a husband. In heterosexual marriages the woman is called a wife; in same-sex marriages between males, each male is called a husband.

Although husband is a close term to groom, the latter is a male participant in a wedding ceremony, while a husband is a married man after the wedding and for the duration of the marriage. The term husband refers to the institutionalized role of the married male, while the term father refers to the male in context of his offspring, a state which may or may not indicate that a marriage ceremony has taken place.

In some cases of heterosexual marriage, before the marriage, the forthcoming husband or his family may have received a dowry, or have had to pay a bride price, or both were exchanged. The dowry not only supported the establishment of a household, but also served as a condition that if the husband committed grave offenses upon his wife, he had to return the dowry to the wife or her family. At the time of the marriage, they were made inalienable by the husband.  He might leave his wife (or wives), then widow (or widows), a dower (often a third or a half of his estate) to support her as dowager.

As an external symbol of the fact that they are married, each spouse commonly wears a wedding ring on the ring finger; whether this is on the left or right hand depends on the country's tradition.

Husband further refers to the institutionalized form in relation to the spouse and offspring, unlike father, a term that puts a man into the context of his children. Also compare the similar husbandry, which in the 14th century referred to the care of the household, but today means the "control or judicious use of resources", conservation, and in agriculture, the cultivation of plants and animals, and the science about its profession.

Western culture

Historical status
 
In premodern heterosexual unions (ancient Roman, medieval, and early modern history), a husband was obliged to protect and support not only his wife and children, but servants and animals of his domain. The father (as the "patron") was awarded much authority, differing from that of his wife (in these cultures, no polygamy existed).

In the Middle Ages and Early Modern European history, it was unusual to marry out of love, but then doing so became an influential ideal. During this period, a husband in a heterosexual marriage had more opportunities in society than his wife, who was not recognized as legally independent.

Contemporary status
In contemporary secularized Western culture, the rights of spouses have been made equal. Civil marriage generally forces the wealthier spouse, the "breadwinner", to provide alimony to the former spouse, even after separation and also after a divorce (see also Law and divorce around the world).

The legal status of marriage allows each spouse to speak on the other's behalf when one is incapacitated (e.g., in a coma); a husband is also responsible for his spouse's child(ren) in states where he is automatically assumed to be the biological father.

Religion

Christianity 

In Christianity, according to the Bible, a husband in a heterosexual marriage has a number of duties:
 To present his bride to God throughout their lives as perfectly holy and virtuous as can be.
 To protect his wife with his own life, physically, emotionally and "spiritually".
 To "lay down" his life, counting her more important than himself.
 To lead his wife and his family into the best things for them.
 To be the best that he can be in God's power.
 To not withhold his body from her.

Islam
In Islamic marital jurisprudence, husbands are considered protectors of the household and their wives. As protector, the husband has various rights and obligations that he is expected to fulfill and thus is offered opportunities different from that of his wife or wives, not only in legal and economical affairs of the family but within the family as well. As in most cases in Islam law and culture, everything is related to the Qur'an.

Many Muslims may agree on a perfectly equal relationship. Islam is the only major religion that puts a cap on polygamy, limiting the number of a man's wives to four—provided the husband can do justice to all of them. Although some religions, such as Catholicism for instance, puts a cap on polygamy altogether, or even serial monogamy, allowing one spouse until death does them apart, not even accepting divorce. According to the teachings of Islam, a Muslim man should have a valid reason and have to get permission from his existing wife (without any force) if he requires to marry again. Islam vehemently abhors any intimate relationship outside the bond of marriage.

There is no external sign to show his status as a husband unless he adopted the tradition of wearing a wedding ring.

Hinduism

A Hindu husband traditionally takes his wife to his home. He is expected to provide for her and to prove his abilities to do so. The marriage in Hinduism is a relationship for Seven births. Before 1951 there was no divorce allowed in Hindu marriage.

In modern times once again after 1951, equal rights for women through society and law jurisdiction is given. In Hinduism, based on the different regions, marriage process is observed differently with the same Saat Pheras around agni kund (light pyre) to be taken to become a husband and wife.

The Encyclopædia Britannica mentions that "In Hindu law, the male members of a joint family, together with their wives, widows, and children, are entitled to support out of the joint property."

Buddhism and Chinese folk religions
China's family laws were changed by the Communist revolution; and in 1950, the People's Republic of China enacted a comprehensive marriage law including provisions giving the spouses equal rights with regard to ownership and management of marital property.

Other cultures
In Japan, before enactment of the Meiji Civil Code of 1898, all of the woman's property such as land or money passed to her husband except for personal clothing and a mirror stand.

Expectation of fidelity

Although there is generally an expectation for a spouse not to have sexual relations with anyone other than his spouse(s), historically, in most cultures, this expectation was not as strong as in the case of wives, a situation which was evident in legal codes which prohibited adultery, with male adultery often being criminalized only if "aggravating" circumstances existed, such as if he brought his mistress into the conjugal home, or if there was public scandal. The double standard was also evident in divorce laws of many countries, such as the UK or Australia, which differentiated between female adultery, which was a ground of adultery by itself, and male adultery, which was a ground only under certain circumstances. This double standard continues to be seen today in many parts of the world. For instance, in the Philippines, a wife can be charged with the crime of adultery (for merely having one act of sexual intercourse with a man other than her husband), while a husband can only be charged with the related crime of concubinage, which is more loosely defined (it requires either keeping the mistress in the family home, or cohabiting with her, or having sexual relations under scandalous circumstances).

A breach of this expectation of fidelity is commonly referred to as adultery or extramarital sex. Historically, adultery has been considered a serious offense, sometimes a crime. Even if that is not so, it may still have legal consequences, particularly a divorce. Adultery may be a factor to consider in a property settlement, it may affect the status of children, the custody of children, etc.

See also

 Cuckold
 Female husband
 Husband-selling
 Hypergamy
 Polyandry
 Polygamy in Christianity
 Wife

References

Further reading
 

 
Terms for men